Hubbell & Benes was a prominent Cleveland, Ohio architectural firm formed by Benjamin Hubbell (1857–1935) and W. Dominick Benes (1867–1953) in 1897 after the pair departed from Coburn, Barnum, Benes & Hubbell. Their work included commercial and residential buildings as well as telephone exchange buildings, the West Side Market and Cleveland Museum of Art. Before teaming up, they worked for Coburn and Barnum. Benes was Jeptha Wade’s personal architect and designed numerous public buildings, commercial buildings, and residences for him including the Wade Memorial Chapel.

Hubbell retired in 1927, but the firm continued and outlived both its original partners. In 1960, it was known as Hubbell, Benes & Hoff, with Benjamin Hubbell's son Benjamin S. Hubbell (1897–1988) the senior partner. Many of the firm's drawings are collected at the Western Reserve Historical Society.
 They designed the Plain Dealer building, also used by the Cleveland Public Library as well as the Ohio Bell Telephone Co. building, an important early Cleveland with modern architecture and Art Deco features. The firm was also known for its designs in Classical Revival architecture.

A number of their works are listed on the U.S. National Register of Historic Places.

Works
Works include (with attribution):

 Wade Memorial Chapel (1901) at 12316 Euclid Avenue in Lake View Cemetery, Cleveland, NRHP-listed 
 Citizens Building (1903), now known as the City Club Building
 Cleveland School of Art (1905) at 1641 Magnolia Drive. Since demolished
 Mather College Gymnasium (1908) at 11120 Bellflower Road . Part of Flora Stone Mather College?
 West Side Market (1912), 1979 West 25th Street, Cleveland, (Hubbell & Benes), NRHP-listed as well as designs for neighboring structures that were never built
 Central YMCA (1912) 2200 Prospect Avenue, Cleveland, (Hubbell & Benes), NRHP-listed
W.S. Tyler Office Building (1913) at 3601-5 Superior Avenue
 Original Illuminating Building (1915) at 75 Public Square, headquarters of the Cleveland Electric Illuminating Company until 1958 when the business relocated to a new Illuminating Building nearby at 55 Public Square in 1958.
 Cleveland Museum of Art (1916) at 11150 East Boulevard
 Cultural buildings around the Wade Park Oval (1916)
 Cleveland Masonic Temple (1921), 3615 Euclid Ave., Cleveland (Hubbell and Benes), NRHP-listed
 Plain Dealer building (1922) that was also used by the Cleveland Public Library at Superior and East 6th. Since demolished
Pearl Street Savings and Trust (1923) at 4175 Pearl and Broadview
 Phyllis Wheatley Association building (1927), 4450 Cedar Ave., Cleveland (Hubbell & Benes), NRHP-listed
 St. Luke's Hospital (Cleveland) (1927) at 11311 Shaker Boulevard
 Ohio Bell Telephone Co. building (1927) at 750 Huron Road, now known as the AT&T Huron Road Building
 University Circle (early plans)
Shaker Heights High School and its auditorium, renovated in 2008.
St. Thomas Episcopal Church, 214 E. Second St. Port Clinton, OH (Coburn, Barnum, Benes & Hubbell), NRHP-listed
One or more works in South Brooklyn Commercial District, roughly along Pearl and Broadview Rds. Cleveland, OH (Hubbell and Benes), NRHP-listed

Other projects

 Residence for Arthur Odell (1892) at 1715 East 82nd Street.  Demolished
 Residence for Arthur O'Dell (1898) at 1709 East 82nd Street.  Demolished
 Residence for Atthur Odell (1898) at 1725 East 82nd Street. Demolished
Cornell Alumni Hall (1899) Ithaca, New York
Residence of W.B. White (1899)
Residence for Benjamin Hubbell (1899) at 1672 East 117th Street. Demolished
Millford Plantation (Thomasville, Georgia), Mill Pond Plantation, Arcadia Plantation (after being divided among the family) a recreational home site and residence for J.H. Wade and family 1903, 1905, 1910 Thomasville, Georgia, (Hubbell & Benes), NRHP-listed as Millpond Plantation
H.E. Gresham Residence (1904)
Fred C. Dorn Residence (1904)
Stephen L. Peirce Residence (1904) at 17856 Lake Road in Lakewood, Ohio
Benes Residence (1905) at 17881 Lake Avenue
Hathaway Brown School (1905) at 1945 East 97th Street. Demolished
Equity Savings and Loan (1905) at 5701 Euclid. Demolished
Commercial block for Joseph Carabelli (1905) Demolished
Commercial block for J.H. Wade (1905) Demolished
Cleveland Telephone Co building (1906) at 5300 Prospect Avenue. Demolished
East End School (1906)  Demolished
Cleveland School of Art -Art Studio Building (1907) Demolished
Brayton Residence (1907) at 10803 Magnolia Drive. Demolished
Wade Garretson Residence (1907) at 10804 Magnolia Drive. Demolished
Cleveland Telephone Company Eddy Exchange (1907) at 12225 St. Clair Avenue
Residence for J.H. Wade (1908) in Gates Mills, Ohio
C.L. F. Weiber Residence (1908) at 12574 Lake Avenue in Lakewood, Ohio. Demolished
Residence for J.H. Wade (1909) at 10831 Magnolia Drive
 Albert and Caleb Gowan Residence (1909) at 11120 Magnolia Drive. Demolished
 Residence of J.W. Wade (1910) in Gates Mills, Ohio
Fries & Schele Department Store (addition and renovation) (1908 and 1912) at 1948 West 25th Street
James C. Pettee Residence (1914) at 11610 Edgewater Drive. Demolished
Cutler Office Building (1915). Demolished
Cleveland Telephone Company Fairmount Exchange (1916) at 13174 Cedar Road in Cleveland Heights
Hough Avenue Congregational Church (1917). Demolished
T.B. Stauffer Residence (1917)
Cleveland Telephone Company St. Clair Exchange (1920) at 12221 St. Clair Avenue
National Malleable Castings building (1921) at 10600 Quincy Avenue. Demolished
G.A. Kositzsky Cottage (1923)
Carmi Thompson Residence (1923)
G.C. King III Residence (1925)
Dr Stoner Residence (1927)
Carabelli Commercial Building
Cleveland Builders Supply Stable and Warehouse Demolished
Cliffside Office Building
D.L. Cockley Residence
East End Baptist Church Demolished
East End School Association building Demolished
Arthur M. Gordon Business Block
Joshua Gregg Residence Demolished
Gross and Riley Apartment Buildings
Halcyon Flats
Parmely Herrick Estate Demolished
Joseph Hummell Apartment Building (Demolished)
William H. Hunt Residence Demolished
Laurel School Demolished
J.P. Murphy Melrose Apartment
National Malleable Castings building. Demolished
New England Apartment Building. Demolished
Ohio Bell Central Exchange in Massilon, Ohio
Rosedale Office Building. Demolished
F. A. Scott Residence
F.G. Smith Residence
Mrs. Taylor Apartment Building
Taylor and Clinton Apartment Buildings
J. H. Wade Farm Building in Mills, Ohio
J.C. Wallace Residence
Frank P. Whitton Apartment Building. Demolished
Woodland Avenue Savings and Trust Demolished
Jeptha Wade Estate, Valley Ridge Farm working buildings in Hunting Valley, Ohio

References

Architecture firms based in Ohio
1939 disestablishments in Ohio